Bengt Gustaf Jansson (born 9 January 1943 in Stockholm, Sweden) is a former Swedish international speedway rider.

"Banger" was runner up in the 1967 World Final to fellow countryman Ove Fundin after losing a race-off and finished third in 1971, again after a run-off.

He rode in Britain for West Ham Hammers, Edinburgh Monarchs, Hackney Hawks, Reading Racers, and finally the Birmingham Brummies. It was as a Hackney rider he won the 1971 London Riders' Championship.

World final appearances

Individual World Championship
 1965 -  London, Wembley Stadium - 4th - 10pts
 1967 -  London, Wembley Stadium - 2nd - 14pts + 2pts
 1968 -  Gothenburg, Ullevi - Reserve - did not ride
 1971 -  Gothenburg, Ullevi - 3rd - 12pts + 2pts
 1974 -  Gothenburg, Ullevi - 5th - 9pts
 1977 -  Gothenburg, Ullevi - 6th - 9pts

World Pairs Championship
 1970 -  Malmö, Malmö Stadion (with Ove Fundin) - 2nd - 25pts (10)
 1972 -  Borås (with Anders Michanek) - 4th - 22pts (7)
 1976 -  Eskilstuna, Eskilstuna Motorstadion (with Bernt Persson) - 3rd - 22pts (11)

World Team Cup
 1965 -  Kempten (with Björn Knutsson / Ove Fundin / Göte Nordin) - 2nd - 33pts (8)
 1967 -  Malmö, Malmö Stadion (with Ove Fundin / Göte Nordin / Torbjörn Harrysson) - Winner - 32pts (9)
 1968 -  London, Wembley Stadium (with Ove Fundin / Anders Michanek / Olle Nygren / Torbjörn Harrysson) - 2nd - 30pts (7)
 1969 -  Rybnik, Rybnik Municipal Stadium (with Sören Sjösten / Ove Fundin / Anders Michanek / Torbjörn Harrysson) - 4th - 12pts (1)
 1970 -  London, Wembley Stadium (with Ove Fundin / Anders Michanek / Sören Sjösten) - Winner - 42pts (11)
 1971 -  Wrocław, Olympic Stadium (with Anders Michanek / Bernt Persson / Soren Sjosten / Leif Enecrona) - 4th - 18pts
 1973 -  London, Wembley Stadium (with Anders Michanek / Bernt Persson / Tommy Jansson) - 2nd - 31pts (6)
 1976 -  London, White City Stadium (with Anders Michanek / Bernt Persson / Lars-Åke Andersson  / Christer Löfqvist) - 3rd - 26pts (1)
 1977 -  Wrocław, Olympic Stadium (with Anders Michanek / Tommy Nilsson / Bernt Persson / Sören Karlsson) - 4th - 11pts (2)

References

External links
www.hackneyhawks.co.uk

1943 births
Living people
Sportspeople from Stockholm
Swedish speedway riders
Hackney Hawks riders
Reading Racers riders
Edinburgh Monarchs riders
West Ham Hammers riders
Birmingham Brummies riders